Leptospermum wooroonooran, commonly known as wurunuru or mountain teatree, is a species of stunted tree that is endemic to Queensland where it grows on exposed mountain ridges. It has thin, fibrous or flaky bark, lance-shaped leaves with the narrower end towards the base, white flowers arranged singly on short side shoots and fruit remain on the plant at maturity.

Description
It has thin, rough, fibrous or flaky bark, the young stems silky hairy at first with a broad flange near the leaf base. The flowers are white,  in diameter and arranged singly on short side shoots. The flower buds have thin, papery, reddish brown bracts at the base but that fall before the flower opens.

Taxonomy and naming
Leptospermum wooroonooran was first formally described in 1889 by Frederick Manson Bailey in Archibald Meston's report to the Queensland Government on his Government Scientific Expedition to the Bellenden-Ker Range (Woonooroonan).

Distribution and habitat
Wurunuru grows on windswept ridges on the mountains north-west of Mossman, in the Mount Spurgeon-Mount Lewis area and in the Bellenden Ker Range in north Queensland.

Use in horticulture
This teatree is sometimes grown in gardens, is suitable for heavy shade and is frost hardy but requires cool, moist conditions.

References

wooroonooran
Myrtales of Australia
Flora of Queensland
Plants described in 1889
Taxa named by Frederick Manson Bailey